Will Cummings (born October 7, 1992) is an American professional basketball player for Zhejiang Lions of the Chinese Basketball Association (CBA). He played college basketball for Temple.

High school career
Cummings, a point guard from Jacksonville, Florida, committed to play for Temple on September 4, 2010. He averaged 18.1 points, 8.1 assists, 4.0 steals per game as a senior at Providence School, in addition to carrying a 4.0 grade point average. The Jacksonville Times-Union named him the high school boys basketball player of the year. Cummings drew attention from Stanford, Miami (Fl.), and Boston College, but chose Temple because of their winning tradition.

|}

College career
As a freshman, Cummings averaged 1.4 points and 0.8 rebounds in 6.3 minutes per game. He started versus George Washington and posted 2 points and an assist.

Cummings played in 34 games as a sophomore, starting 32, and averaged 5.8 points, 1.9 assists, and 1.4 steals per game. He posted double-figures scoring in six games, including a season-high 15 points in a victory over Rhode Island.

In his junior season, Cummings was a Second Team Philadelphia Big 5 selection. He averaged 16.8 points, a team-leading 4.6 assists and 1.5 steals in 34.4 minutes per game. He scored 31 points in a game against UCF.

As a senior, Cummings was named to the First Team All-American Athletic Conference. He missed a game against Cincinnati after suffering a strained muscle in his leg on January 10, 2015. He led the team in scoring (14.8 points per game), assists (4.2 per game) and steals (1.9 per game). With 189 free throws made, he finished tied for second in school history in made free throws in a season. Additionally, Cummings completed his collegiate career 35th on Temple's all-time scoring list, and led the team to a 17-win improvement from the previous year, the highest in the nation. Temple reached the NIT semifinals.

Professional career

2015–16 season
After going undrafted in the 2015 NBA draft, Cummings joined the Houston Rockets for the 2015 NBA Summer League. On September 3, 2015, he signed with the Rockets, only to be waived by the team on October 23 after appearing in six preseason games. On November 2, he was acquired by the Rio Grande Valley Vipers of the NBA Development League as an affiliate player of the Rockets. On November 13, he made his professional debut in a 110–106 win over the Idaho Stampede, recording 11 points and 5 assists in 32 minutes. On January 29, 2016, he was named in the West All-Star team for the 2016 NBA D-League All-Star Game. At the season's end, he was named to the All-NBA D-League Second Team and All-Rookie Team.

On April 29, 2016, Cummings left Rio Grande Valley and signed with Dolomiti Energia Trento of the Italian LBA for the rest of the season. On May 4, he made his debut with Dolomiti Energia in a 73–70 loss to Juvecaserta Basket, recording 12 points, three rebounds and two steals in 18 minutes of the bench.

2016–17 season
In July 2016, Cummings joined the San Antonio Spurs for the 2016 NBA Summer League, and on July 24, 2016, Cummings signed with Greek Basket League club Aris Thessaloniki. In the semifinals of the 2017 Greek Cup, Cummings scored the game-winning lay-up against AEK Athens, to give Aris the ticket to the Cup Final against Panathinaikos Athens.

2017–18 season
On July 17, 2017, Cummings signed a 1+1 year deal with the Turkish club Darüşşafaka. Cummings helped Darüşşafaka to win the 2018 EuroCup title.

2018–19 season
On July 6, 2018, Cummings signed with the German team EWE Baskets Oldenburg for the 2018–19 season. He got honored with the MVP title and lead his team to the 2nd place in the regular season.

2019–20 season
On July 7, 2019, Cummings signed a two-year contract with Lokomotiv Kuban of the Russian VTB United League.

2020–21 season
Cummings averaged 12.8 points, 2.0 rebounds, 3.5 assists and 1.2 steals per game for Lokomotiv Kuban during the 2020–21 season.

2021–22 season
On July 23, 2021, Cummings signed with Metropolitans 92 of the LNB Pro A.

2022–23 season
On August 17, 2022, he has signed with Zhejiang Lions of the Chinese Basketball Association (CBA).

Career statistics

Eurocup

|-
| style="text-align:left;"|2017–18
| style="text-align:left;"| Darüşşafaka
| 22 || 3 || 18.0 || .540 || .178 || .837 || 1.8 || 2.1 || .7 || .7 || 9 || 6.6
|-
| style="text-align:left;"|2019–20
| style="text-align:left;" rowspan="2"|Lokomotiv
| 10 || 7 || 26.4 || .525 || .250 || .806 || 1.9 || 3.2 || 1.5 || 1.2 || 12.7 || 10.6
|-
| style="text-align:left;"|2020–21
| 19 || 3 || 22.2 || .491 || .372 || .805 || 1.8 || 2.5 || 0.9 || 0.6 || 12.0 || 12.9

References

External links
 Will Cummings Champions League profile at basketballcl.com
 
 Will Cummings at DraftExpress.com
 Will Cummings at RealGM.com
  Will Cummings Greek League profile at baskethotel.com
 Will Cummings Italian League profile at legabasket.it 
 Will Cummings at Temple Owls
 Will Cummings Turkish League profile at TBLStat.net

1992 births
Living people
American expatriate basketball people in Germany
American expatriate basketball people in Greece
American expatriate basketball people in Italy
American expatriate basketball people in Russia
American expatriate basketball people in Turkey
American men's basketball players
Aquila Basket Trento players
Aris B.C. players
Basketball players from Jacksonville, Florida
Darüşşafaka Basketbol players
EWE Baskets Oldenburg players
Metropolitans 92 players
PBC Lokomotiv-Kuban players
Point guards
Rio Grande Valley Vipers players
Temple Owls men's basketball players